The Dark Destroyer is the nickname of:

 Nigel Benn (born 1964), British former professional boxer who competed from 1987 to 1996.
 Deta Hedman (born 1959), Jamaican-born English darts player.
 Monique Jones (born 1979), American professional female bodybuilder.
 Shaun Wallace (born 1960), English "Chaser" on the ITV quiz show The Chase, and barrister.

Nicknames in sports
Nicknames in boxing